Cat, Dog & Co. is a 1929 Our Gang short silent comedy film directed by Anthony Mack. Produced by Hal Roach and released to theaters by Metro-Goldwyn-Mayer, it was the 91st entry in the series.

Plot
Joe, Farina, and Harry are racing their dog-powered cars when they are stopped and reported to the President of the Be Kind to Animals Society. After promising to be kind to animals, the boys are made honorary society members. They soon convince other children to be kind to animals, and they release them from their cages to ensuing chaos.

Cast

The Gang
 Joe Cobb as Joe
 Jean Darling as Jean
 Allen Hoskins as Farina
 Bobby Hutchins as Wheezer
 Mary Ann Jackson as Mary Ann
 Harry Spear as Harry
 Donnie Smith as Don
 Pete the Pup as Pete

Additional cast
 Chet Brandenburg as Taxi driver
 Ray Cooke as Pedestrian
 Clara Guiol as Pedestrian
 Jack Hill as Pedestrian
 Hedda Hopper as President of the Be Kind to Animals Society
 John B. O'Brien as Fruit vendor
 Bob Saunders as Trucker
 Syd Saylor as Pedestrian
 Dorothy Vernon as Pedestrian
 Adele Watson as Lady who snitched
 S. D. Wilcox as Officer

See also
 Our Gang filmography

References

External links

1929 films
1929 comedy films
1929 short films
American silent short films
American black-and-white films
Films directed by Robert A. McGowan
Metro-Goldwyn-Mayer short films
Transitional sound comedy films
Our Gang films
Films with screenplays by H. M. Walker
1920s American films
Silent American comedy films